Markt Schwaben station is a railway station on the Munich S-Bahn in the municipality of Markt Schwaben in the northeast area of Munich, Germany. It is served by the S-Bahn line .

History
The Munich–Mühldorf railway was taken in operation on 1 May 1871. Subsequently, the municipality of Erding also tried for a railway connection, this could be opened on 16 November 1872. In 1970, the Markt Schwaben–Erding railway and Munich–Mühldorf railway (Munich-Markt Schwaben section) was electrified to introduce a S-Bahn operation on these lines. In 1972, with the establishment of the Munich S-Bahn system, Markt Schwaben was better connected, including by the connection to Munich through the Münchner Verkehrs- und Tarifverbund.

References

Munich S-Bahn stations
Railway stations in Bavaria
Railway stations in Germany opened in 1871
1871 establishments in Bavaria
Buildings and structures in Ebersberg (district)